Susan Camille Saegert (born 12 October 1946), Guadalupe, Texas is Professor of Environmental Psychology at the CUNY Graduate Center. She was previously Professor of Human and Organizational Development at Vanderbilt University (Peabody College) in Nashville, TN.

Prior to her current appointment in 2008, Dr. Saegert was Director of the Center for Human Environments (CHE) and Professor of Environmental Psychology at the CUNY Graduate Center where she has worked since receiving her PhD in Social Psychology from the University of Michigan in 1974. She was also the first director of the Center for the Study of Women and Society at the CUNY Graduate Center.

Early life 
Susan Camille Saegert was born on 12 October 1946, she is the daughter of Albert Saegert and Patricia Camille McIntyre.

Education 
Saegert gained her degree from the University of Texas in 1968, and her doctorate from the University of Michigan in 1974.

Career 
Her early research focused on crowding and environmental stressors. She then began to study the relationship between housing and human development and well-being, as well as women and environments. These interests involved her with a team of architects, planners and housing finance experts in developing a plan for Downtown Denver that increased residential uses and amenities, which is evidenced in the cityscape of Denver today.

Her research in inner city communities led her to focus less on how housing conditions can affect residents and more on how communities can affect housing conditions. With colleagues at CHE in the Housing Environments Research Group (HERG), she and Gary Winkel have worked in partnership with community organizations and coalitions to understand how to successfully improve distressed housing and neighborhoods in New York City. This work has also resulted in a book on social capital co-edited with two political scientists: S. Saegert, J.P. Thompson, & M. R. Warren (Eds) Social capital and poor communities. New York: Russell Sage, 2001.

In 2007 she was quoted in David Gonzalez's New York Times' article "Risky loans help build ghost town of new homes" noting that in New York a trend is developing where “whole neighborhoods are wiped out, crime increases, the neighborhood’s reputation goes down, quality of life is undermined, and people can’t sell their houses,” due to the accessibility of adjustable rate loans and bad mortgages.

Her professional activities have included serving as president of Division 34 on Population and Environment of the American Psychological Association, co-chairing the Environmental Design Research Association, and more recently serving on the American Psychological Association's Task Force on Urban Psychology. She also chaired the American Psychological Association Task Force on Social and Economic Status (SES)which then became a standing committee of APA.  She has served on the editorial boards of Environment & Behavior and the Journal of Environmental Psychology for most of the last 20 years. With Gary Winkel, she wrote the Annual Review of Environmental Psychology for 1990.

Bibliography

Books 
 
  Reviewed by The New York Times, 23 February 1989.

Chapters in books

Journal articles

Papers

References

External links
 

American women psychologists
21st-century American psychologists
Environmental psychologists
Graduate Center, CUNY faculty
New Urbanism communities
University of Michigan alumni
University of Texas at Austin alumni
Vanderbilt University faculty
1946 births
Saegart, Susan
American women academics
20th-century American psychologists